The 2016–17 Women's FIH Hockey World League Round 2 was held from January to April 2017. A total of 24 teams competing in 3 events took part in this round of the tournament playing for 8 berths in the Semifinals, to be played in June and July 2017.

Qualification
9 teams ranked between 12th and 20th in the FIH World Rankings current at the time of seeking entries for the competition qualified automatically. However, Belgium was chosen to host a Semifinal, hence exempt from Round 2 and leaving 8 teams qualified. Additionally 15 teams qualified from Round 1, as well as one nation that did not meet ranking criteria and was exempt from Round 1 to host a Round 2 tournament. The following 24 teams, shown with final pre-tournament rankings, competed in this round of the tournament.

Kuala Lumpur
Kuala Lumpur, Malaysia, 14–22 January 2017.

All times are local (UTC+8).

First round

Pool A

Pool B

Second round

Bracket

5–8th place bracket

Quarterfinals

Fifth to eighth place classification

Crossover

Seventh and eighth place

Fifth and sixth place

First to fourth place classification

Semifinals

Third and fourth place

Final

Final ranking

Valencia
Valencia, Spain, 4–12 February 2017.

All times are local (UTC+1).

First round

Pool A

Pool B

Second round

Bracket

5–8th place bracket

Quarterfinals

Fifth to eighth place classification

Crossover

Seventh and eighth place

Fifth and sixth place

First to fourth place classification

Semifinals

Third and fourth place

Final

Final ranking

West Vancouver
West Vancouver, Canada, 1–9 April 2017.

All times are local (UTC−8).

First round

Pool A

Pool B

Second round

Bracket

5–7th place bracket

Quarterfinals

Fifth to seventh place classification

Crossover

Fifth and sixth place

First to fourth place classification

Semifinals

Third and fourth place

Final

Final ranking

References

External links
Official website (Kuala Lumpur)
Official website (Valencia)
Official website (Vancouver)

Round 2
International women's field hockey competitions hosted by Malaysia
International women's field hockey competitions hosted by Spain
International women's field hockey competitions hosted by Canada
Hockey
Hockey
Hockey